Yuliya Sergeyevna Voyevodina (17 October 1971 – 4 May 2022) was a Russian race walker. She was born in Kuznetsk, Penza Oblast.

She was married to Aleksey Voyevodin.

Voyevodina died on 4 May 2022, at the age of 50.

Achievements

References

External links 

Yuliya Voyevodina on sports-reference

1971 births
2022 deaths
Russian female racewalkers
Athletes (track and field) at the 2004 Summer Olympics
Olympic athletes of Russia
Sportspeople from Penza Oblast
People from Kuznetsk
20th-century Russian women